Nicolas Barone (6 March 1931 in Paris, France – 31 May 2003 in Mougins, France) is a former French professional road bicycle racer. He was professional from 1955 to 1961 where he won 7 races. He wore the yellow jersey for one day in the 1957 Tour de France. His victories include two stage wins in the Tour de Luxembourg, one stage win in Paris–Nice, Paris–Camembert in 1958 and 1959.

Major results

1954
Route du France (for cyclist under 23 years)
1955
Guéret
Langon
1957
Tour de France:
Wearing yellow jersey for one day
1958
Paris–Camembert
Cazès-Mondenard
1959
Paris–Camembert

External links 
Nicolas Barone at Memoire du cyclisme (archive)

French male cyclists
1931 births
2003 deaths
Cyclists from Paris